Vanessa Vassiliki Panousis (born 23 February 1995) is an Australian professional basketball player.

Career

College
Panousis played college basketball for the Virginia Tech Hokies in Blacksburg, Virginia in the Atlantic Coast Conference. She had a very successful college career. Being named to the ACC All-Academic Team twice. She was also known to the ACC All-Tournament Second Team in her sophomore year, alongside the likes of eventual No. 1 pick in the 2015 WNBA draft, Jewell Loyd.

Virginia Tech statistics

Source

WNBL
Panousis was a development player with the Sydney Uni Flames for the 2012–13 WNBL season. After finishing her college career, Panousis has been signed by the Adelaide Lightning for the 2017–18 WNBL season. There she will join the likes of Laura Hodges and Abby Bishop.

National team

Youth Level
Panousis made her international debut for the Sapphires at the 2011 FIBA Oceania Under-16 Championship in Canberra, Australia. She would once again represent the Sapphires at the 2012 Under-17 World Championship in Amsterdam, Netherlands, where Australia placed 5th. Panousis would then represent the Gems at the Under-19 World Championship in Lithuania the following year, where they finished in third place and took home the bronze medal. She also represented Australia at the 2015 Summer Universiade in Gwangju, South Korea, where they placed 5th.

References

1995 births
Living people
Australian expatriate basketball people in the United States
Australian women's basketball players
Guards (basketball)
Sportswomen from New South Wales
Sydney Uni Flames players
Virginia Tech Hokies women's basketball players
Universiade medalists in basketball
Universiade gold medalists for Australia
Medalists at the 2017 Summer Universiade